The 2015–16 Basketligaen was the 41st season of the highest professional basketball tier in Denmark. The season started on October 3, 2015 and ended on May 9, 2016. Horsens IC won the Danish championship for the second year in a row, after it defeated Bakken Bears in the Finals.

Competition format
The participating teams first played a round-robin schedule with every team playing each opponent twice home and twice away for a total of 28 games. The top six teams qualified for the championship playoffs whilst the two last qualified were relegated to Division 1.

Regular season

Playoffs

Awards
Nimrod Hilliard of Horsens was named the 2016 Finals MVP. Brandon Rozzell of Svendborg Rabbits was named the 2015–16 Regular Season MVP.

Attendances
Attendances include playoff games:

References

External links
Official Basketligaen website

Basketligaen seasons
Danish
Basketball
Basketball